Carl Georg Enslen (20 September 1792 – 17 April 1866) was an Austrian-born German painter.

Biography
Enslen was born in Vienna in 1792, and studied at the Academy of Berlin. He travelled in Italy, Sweden, Norway, and Denmark, and his panoramas give proof of a knowledge of excellent linear and aerial perspective. He was the son of Johann Carl Enslen, with whom he worked closely. He died in Lille, France in 1866, aged 73.

Collections
His work is included in the collections of the Swedish National Museum, the  Swiss National Museum, Zurich, the City History Museum, Leipzig, and the Sankt-Anne Museum in Lübeck, Germany.

Gallery

References

 
 Thieme-Becker: Allgemeines Lexikon der bildenden Künstler, vol. 10, Leipzig 1914, p. 567

1792 births
1866 deaths
Austrian landscape painters
Austrian male painters
Artists from Vienna
Prussian Academy of Arts alumni
Members of the Academy of Arts, Berlin